Scott Mathew Hemond (born November 18, 1965) is an American former professional baseball catcher. He played in Major League Baseball (MLB) from - for the Oakland Athletics, Chicago White Sox, and St. Louis Cardinals.

Amateur career
Scott was drafted in the 5th round by the Kansas City Royals out of Dunedin High School, where his number "11" was retired, but elected to attend college to pursue his education and college baseball career.   

Hemond played collegiate baseball for the University of South Florida where his number "11" was again retired.  Hemond was a 2 time All-American, played on the highest ranked baseball team in USF history.  In 1984, he played collegiate summer baseball for the Hyannis Mets of the Cape Cod Baseball League (CCBL). He returned to the league in 1986 with the Harwich Mariners. Hemond led the CCBL in batting in 1986 (.358), and was named league MVP. He was inducted into the CCBL Hall of Fame in 2007.  In1985 Scott played for the USA Baseball Team. In 1986 Hemond was "USF Male Athlete of the Year" and finalist for the "Golden Spikes Award".  According to Jim Louk, voice of the USF Athletics, as a junior catcher, Scott was rated the sixth best prospect in all of college baseball by one pre-season publication.

Professional career
In 1986, Hemond was drafted in the 1st round (12th pick) by the Oakland Athletics, where he played 7 seasons in the Major League as a utility player, playing every position at the MLB level except shortstop and pitcher.

References

External links

1965 births
Living people
Madison Muskies players
Huntsville Stars players
Tacoma Tigers players
Louisville Redbirds players
Baseball players from Massachusetts
Major League Baseball catchers
Oakland Athletics players
South Florida Bulls baseball players
Chicago White Sox players
St. Louis Cardinals players
Amarillo Dillas players
Dunedin High School alumni
Harwich Mariners players
Hyannis Harbor Hawks players